Mourad Abdelouahab (died August 2008) was an Algerian football manager.

Career
Abdelouahab managed the Algerian national team, as well as club side USM Alger.

References

Date of birth missing
2008 deaths
Algerian football managers
Algeria national football team managers
USM Alger managers
21st-century Algerian people